Gervasius is a masculine given name. It may refer to:

 Gervasius and Protasius, Christian martyrs, probably in the 2nd century
 Gervase of Tilbury (Gervasius Tilberiensis in Latin) (c. 1150–1220), English canon lawyer, statesman and cleric
 Gervasius de Wolvehope (fl. 1295–1302), English Member of Parliament
 Gervasius, Bishop of Nyitra (died after c. 1128), Hungarian prelate
 Gervasius, Bishop of Győr (died after 1157 or 1158), Hungarian prelate

See also
 Gervase (disambiguation)
 Gervaise (disambiguation)

Masculine given names